The 2022 Shore Lunch 200 was the 20th and final stock car race of the 2022 ARCA Menards Series season, and the 82nd iteration of the event. The race was held on Saturday, October 8, 2022, in Toledo, Ohio at Toledo Speedway, a 0.5 mile (0.804 km) permanent oval-shaped racetrack. The race took the scheduled 200 laps to complete. In an exciting finish with four laps to go, Sammy Smith, driving for Kyle Busch Motorsports, would steal the win after moving Jesse Love out of the way with two laps to go. This was Smith's sixth career ARCA Menards Series win, along with his sixth of the season. Jesse Love would dominate the entire race, leading 192 laps.

Nick Sanchez, driving for Rev Racing, would claim the 2022 ARCA Menards Series championship, finishing 14 points ahead of second position, which was Daniel Dye. Sanchez would become the first driver born in Hispanic ancestry to win the championship.

Background 
Toledo Speedway is a half-mile paved oval racetrack located in Toledo, Ohio, United States. It is owned jointly by Roy Mott and ARCA President Ron Drager. It is operated by ARCA and run as the sister track to Flat Rock Speedway in Flat Rock, Michigan.

Entry list 

 (R) denotes rookie driver

Practice 
The only 45-minute practice session was held on Saturday, October 8, at 11:45 AM EST.

Qualifying 
Qualifying was held on Saturday, October 8, at 1:30 PM EST. The qualifying system used is a single-car, two-lap system with only one round. Whoever sets the fastest time in the round wins the pole.

Race results

Standings after the race 

Drivers' Championship standings

Note: Only the first 10 positions are included for the driver standings.

References

External links 

2022 ARCA Menards Series
Shore Lunch 200
Shore Lunch 200